Return to Amish is an American reality television series on the TLC television network that debuted May 22, 2014. It is a spinoff and continuation series to Breaking Amish which ran four seasons from 2012 to 2014. The series deal with the original cast members of Breaking Amish returning to their hometowns and trying to adjust to living in their Amish communities once again, but come across problems or make choices along the way that interfere with that goal and thus remain shunned for the time being.

On March 25, 2022, an article from the site  revealed a 7th Season was being filmed, despite TLC not giving a date for its eventual release. However, on November 14, 2022, it is revealed that the new season is set to air on March 14, 2023.

Overview

On May 1, 2014, it was announced that Breaking Amish was spawning a spin-off, entitled Return to Amish following the Breaking Amish cast members of seasons one and two who all lived in Pennsylvania at the time of production, except for Kate, who resided in New York City. The two-hour premiere debuted on June 1, 2014, with the season airing seven episodes.

A second season of Return to Amish premiered on May 31, 2015. On June 14, 2016, the show was renewed for a third season with a premiere date of July 10, 2016.  A trailer released by TLC revealed much of the original cast returning, including Mary and Sabrina, who appeared in seasons one, two and three, but was absent from the fourth. The fourth season was originally set to be Mary's last and it possibly being the final season altogether.

The show's fifth season premiered on November 18, 2018. Jeremiah, Mary, and Sabrina returned but not Abe and Rebecca. The returning three cast members were joined by several new cast members: Dawn, Shelly, Lowell, and Ada. Cast member Matt from the fourth season of Breaking Amish makes guest appearances this season. The season follows Jeremiah and his wife Carmela as they travel across country running their donut business with the help of Amish and Mennonite workers who are eager to break loose into the English world. Critics have claimed some of the episodes have scripted elements.

Cast

Season 1

Episodes

Season 1 (2014)

Season 2 (2015)
Sabrina High does not return full-time but does make guest appearances. Mary Schmucker has stated this will be her final season. Rebecca Schmucker has stated it will also be the final season for her and Abe.

Season 3 (2016)

Season 4 (2017)
For this season, the episodes are all two hours long (including commercials).

Season 5 (2018–19)
For this season, the episodes return to the hour-long format (including commercials) of the first five seasons with the exception of the season premiere and the sixth, seventh and eighth episodes, which run two hours like the previous season episodes.

Season 6 (2021)

See also
Amish in the City
Breaking Amish

References

External links
Official site

2010s American reality television series
2012 American television series debuts
Amish in popular culture
English-language television shows
TLC (TV network) original programming
Television shows set in Los Angeles
Television shows set in New York City
Mennonitism in popular culture
Reality television spin-offs
American television spin-offs